William Erle "Bill" Collins (9 July 1929 – 28 September 2013) was an American parasitologist.

Collins grew up in Lansing, Michigan, where he graduated from high school. He received his B.S. and M.Sc. in entomology from Michigan State University and then completed his Ph.D. in 1954 at Rutgers University in two years. After being drafted into the U.S. Army, he did his military service at the U.S. Army Biological Warfare laboratories at Fort Detrick. While stationed there, he married Janet Johnson in July 1956. After leaving the Army he worked at Rutgers University as an extension entomologist. In 1959 he was employed by the U.S. Public Health Service at the National Institute of Allergy and Infectious Diseases (NIAID) in Columbia, South Carolina.

In 1973 the laboratory operation headed by Collins was transferred to the operational control of the Centers for Disease Control (CDC) and the research emphasis changed from monkey malarial parasites in monkeys to human malarial parasites in monkeys.

Collins was infected twice with Plasmodium during his years of laboratory work. He was the author or coauthor of more than 450 scientific publications.

Upon his death he was survived by his widow, two children, and two grandchildren.

Awards
 1985 — Joseph Augustin LePrince Medal from the American Society of Tropical Medicine and Hygiene (ASTMH)
 2001 — William C. Watson, Jr. Medal of Excellence from CDC
 2001 — Harry Hoogstraal Medal from the ASTMH, recognizing lifelong service to medical entomology
 2012 — Henrique Aragão Medal at the XVIII International Congress of Tropical Medicine and Malaria

References

1929 births
2013 deaths
American parasitologists
Malariologists
Michigan State University alumni
Rutgers University alumni